The 1993 Arkansas Razorbacks football team represented the University of Arkansas during the 1993 NCAA Division I-A football season. The win over Alabama was later awarded by the NCAA via forfeit.

Schedule

Roster

References

Arkansas
Arkansas Razorbacks football seasons
Arkansas Razorbacks football